My Love Toram is a 2005 South Korean two-part SBS Special Drama starring Ha Hee-ra. It is based on the real Jun Suk-yeon's book about her beloved dog. Jun is the first woman in Korea to own a guide dog.

Plot
Jeon Sook-yeon (Ha Hee-ra) is happily married with two children, but becomes blind in an accident. At first in despair, she finds new hope to live again through the help of her guide dog, Toram.

Cast
Ha Hee-ra as Jeon Sook-yeon
Kim Young-ho as Kim Sung-min
Kwon Hae-hyo as Yeom Dong-ho
Kim Hak-joon as Kim Bum-young
Ha Seung-ri as Kim Eun-bi
Lee Dae-yeon as Kim Il-bong

References

External links
 

Seoul Broadcasting System television dramas
South Korean romance television series
Korean-language television shows
2005 South Korean television series debuts
2005 South Korean television series endings